The second series of Bad Girls began on ITV1 on 4 April 2000.  The first episode, "Tug of Love", opened with 9.44 million viewers.  The ninth episode of series two, "The Leaving", was the highest-rated episode of the entire run of the series between 1999 and 2006, with 9.49 million viewers.  The second series ended on 4 July 2000; it consists of 13 episodes.

The second series picks up several weeks after the last.  Helen Stewart is long overdue to return to work after taking leave and Fenner is acting wing governor until her return.  Shell and Fenner's affair reaches a head when he discovers Shell has been writing and phoning his wife and told her of their affair.  Helen discovers Nikki is innocent of contacting Fenner wife, as Shell originally had Fenner believing it was Nikki.  Fenner attacks Shell for deceiving him, which causes conflict between Helen and Mr. Stubberfield as Helen believers that Fenner did attack Shell, the conflict causes Helen to resign and brings her closer to Nikki, but she later returns to run the lifer's unit.  New officer Karen Betts accepts the role of G-Wing governor.  Zandra gives birth to a baby boy but her happiness is short lived as her ex fiancé, Robin applies for custody and things get worse for her as she receives devastating news.  Yvonne begins to do deals with Fenner, Denny gets in contact with her estranged mother, Jessie, and Julie Johnston discovers her kids are back in England and gets in touch.

Cast

Main
 Simone Lahbib as Helen Stewart
 Claire King as Karen Betts
 Mandana Jones as Nikki Wade
 Debra Stephenson as Shell Dockley
 Jack Ellis as Jim Fenner
 Alicya Eyo as Denny Blood
 Joe Shaw as Dominic McAllister
 Lara Cazalet as Zandra Plackett
 Sharon Duncan Brewster as Crystal Gordon
 Linda Henry as Yvonne Atkins
 Isabelle Amyes as Barbara Hunt
 Lindsey Fawcett as Shaz Wylie
 Nathan Constance as Josh Mitchell
 Tracey Wilkinson as Di Barker
 Helen Fraser as Sylvia Hollamby
 Victoria Alcock as Julie Saunders
 Kika Mirylees as Julie Johnston

Recurring
 Philip McGough as Dr. Malcolm Nicholson
 Roland Oliver as Simon Stubberfield
 Kim Taylforth as Marilyn Fenner
 Alison Newman as Renee Williams
 Gideon Turner as Robin Dunstan
 Eugene Walker as Officer Blakeson
 Danielle King as Lauren Atkins
 Ivan Kaye as Charlie Atkins
 Geoffrey Hutchings as Bobby Hollamby
 Denise Black as Jessie Devlin
 Helen Schlesinger as Tessa Spall
 Jade Williams as Rhiannon Dawson

Guest
 Ruth Mitchell as Midwife
 Melanie Ramsey as Mel
 Matthew Thomas as Tom Fenner
 Frederick Warder as D.I. Williamson
 Scott Charles as Martin Dawson
 Emily Fairman as Nurse
 Nick Barnes as Security Guard
 Andy Hough as Billy
 Sian Webber as Meg Richards
 Daniel James as Personal Trainer
 Julie Legrand as Rita Dockley
 David Case as Chaplain
 Rod Culbertson as John
 Celia Robertson as D C Greer
 Jason Heatherington as D S Sullivan
 Danielle Lydon as Claire Walker
 Jennifer Luckraft as Janine
 Elizabeth Bradley as Mrs. Foster

Episodes

Reception

Ratings

Awards and nominations
 National Television Awards (2000) – Most Popular Actress (Debra Stephenson – Nominated)
 National Television Awards (2000) – Most Popular Drama (Won)
 TV Quick Awards (2000) – Best Loved Drama (Won)

Release

The second series of Bad Girls was originally released in the UK on VHS in four volumes.  The DVD was released in the UK on 1 October 2001.  It was re-released on 7 February 2011 in brand new packaging.  On the same day it was released in a boxset along with series one.  On 9 October 2006, it was released as part of a series one-four boxset.

In Australia, series two was released on 26 May 2003 in the same cover packaging as the UK.  The second release for series two was in the complete series one-eight boxset - "The Complete Collection", which was released on 10 November 2010.  It was also released as a separate edition from the complete boxset on 12 January 2011.

References

External links
 
 List of Bad Girls episodes at Epguides

2000 American television seasons
02